In geometry, a 7-cube is a seven-dimensional hypercube with 128 vertices, 448 edges,  672 square faces, 560 cubic cells, 280 tesseract 4-faces, 84 penteract 5-faces, and 14 hexeract 6-faces.

It can be named by its Schläfli symbol {4,35}, being composed of 3 6-cubes around each 5-face.  It can be called a hepteract,  a portmanteau of tesseract (the 4-cube) and hepta for seven (dimensions) in Greek. It can also be called a regular tetradeca-7-tope or tetradecaexon, being a 7 dimensional polytope constructed from 14 regular facets.

Related polytopes
The 7-cube is 7th in a series of hypercube:

The dual of a 7-cube is called a 7-orthoplex, and is a part of the infinite family of cross-polytopes.

Applying an alternation operation, deleting alternating vertices of the hepteract, creates another uniform polytope, called a demihepteract, (part of an infinite family called demihypercubes), which has 14 demihexeractic and 64 6-simplex 6-faces.

As a configuration
This configuration matrix represents the 7-cube. The rows and columns correspond to vertices, edges, faces, cells, 4-faces, 5-faces and 6-faces. The diagonal numbers say how many of each element occur in the whole 7-cube. The nondiagonal numbers say how many of the column's element occur in or at the row's element.

Cartesian coordinates 
Cartesian coordinates for the vertices of a hepteract centered at the origin and edge length 2 are
 (±1,±1,±1,±1,±1,±1,±1)
while the interior of the same consists of all points (x0, x1, x2, x3, x4, x5, x6) with -1 < xi < 1.

Projections

References 

 H.S.M. Coxeter: 
 Coxeter, Regular Polytopes, (3rd edition, 1973), Dover edition, p. 296, Table I (iii): Regular Polytopes, three regular polytopes in n-dimensions (n≥5)
 H.S.M. Coxeter, Regular Polytopes, 3rd Edition, Dover New York, 1973, p. 296, Table I (iii): Regular Polytopes, three regular polytopes in n-dimensions (n≥5)
 Kaleidoscopes: Selected Writings of H.S.M. Coxeter, edited by F. Arthur Sherk, Peter McMullen, Anthony C. Thompson, Asia Ivic Weiss, Wiley-Interscience Publication, 1995,  
 (Paper 22) H.S.M. Coxeter, Regular and Semi Regular Polytopes I, [Math. Zeit. 46 (1940) 380-407, MR 2,10]
 (Paper 23) H.S.M. Coxeter, Regular and Semi-Regular Polytopes II, [Math. Zeit. 188 (1985) 559-591]
 (Paper 24) H.S.M. Coxeter, Regular and Semi-Regular Polytopes III, [Math. Zeit. 200 (1988) 3-45]
 Norman Johnson Uniform Polytopes, Manuscript (1991)
 N.W. Johnson: The Theory of Uniform Polytopes and Honeycombs, Ph.D. (1966)

External links 
 
 

 Multi-dimensional Glossary: hypercube Garrett Jones
 Rotation of 7D-Cube www.4d-screen.de

7-polytopes
Articles containing video clips